Attorney General Fisher may refer to:

Charles Fisher (Canadian politician) (1808–1880), Attorney General of Canada
D. Michael Fisher (born 1944), Attorney General of Pennsylvania
George P. Fisher (1817–1899), Attorney General of Delaware
Lee Fisher (born 1951), Attorney General of Ohio

See also
General Fisher (disambiguation)